Luigi Dallapiccola (February 3, 1904 – February 19, 1975) was an Italian composer known for his lyrical twelve-tone compositions.

Biography

Dallapiccola was born in Pisino d'Istria (at the time part of Austria-Hungary, current Pazin, Croatia), to Italian parents.

Unlike many composers born into highly musical environments, his early musical career was irregular at best. Political disputes over his birthplace of Istria, then part of the Austro-Hungarian empire, led to instability and frequent moves. His father was headmaster of an Italian-language school – the only one in the city – which was shut down at the start of World War I. The family, considered politically subversive, was placed in internment at Graz, Austria, where the budding composer did not even have access to a piano, though he did attend performances at the local opera house, which cemented his desire to pursue composition as a career. Once back in his hometown Pisino after the war, he travelled frequently.

Dallapiccola took his piano degree at the Florence Conservatory (now known as the Luigi Cherubini Conservatory) in the 1920s. He also studied composition with Vito Frazzi.
He became a professor at the conservatory in 1931; until his 1967 retirement, he spent his career there teaching lessons in piano as a secondary instrument, replacing his teacher Ernesto Consolo as the older man's illness prevented him from continuing. Dallapiccola's students include Abraham Zalman Walker, Luciano Berio, Bernard Rands, Donald Martino, Halim El-Dabh, Julia Perry, Ernesto Rubin de Cervin, Arlene Zallman, Roland Trogan, Noel Da Costa, and Raymond Wilding-White. 

Dallapiccola's early experiences under the fascist regime of Benito Mussolini, who governed Italy from October 1922 to July 1943, colored his outlook and output for the rest of his life. He once supported Mussolini, believing the propaganda, and it was not until the 1930s that he became passionate about his political views, in protest to the Abyssinian campaign and Italy's involvement in the Spanish Civil War. Mussolini's sympathy with Adolf Hitler's views on race, which threatened Dallapiccola's Jewish wife Laura Luzzatto, only hardened his stance. Canti di prigionia and Il prigioniero are reflections of this impassioned concern; the former was his first true protest work.

During World War II he was in the dangerous position of opposing the Nazis; though he tried to go about his career as usual, and did, to a limited extent. On two occasions he was forced to go into hiding for several months. Dallapiccola continued his touring as a recitalist – but only in countries not occupied by the Nazis.

Though it was only after the war that his compositions made it into the public eye (with his opera Il prigioniero sparking his fame), it was then that his life became relatively quiet. He made frequent travels to the United States, including appearances at Tanglewood in the summers of 1951 and 1952 and several semesters of teaching courses in composition at Queens College, New York beginning in 1956. He was a sought-after lecturer throughout Western Europe and the Americas. Dallapiccola's 1968 opera Ulisse would be the peak of his career, after which his compositional output was sparse; his later years were largely spent writing essays rather than music.

He had no more finished compositions after 1972 due to his failing health, and he died in Florence in 1975 of edema of the lungs.  There are, however, very few sketches and fragments of work from this period, including a vocal work left unfinished just hours before his death.

Music
It was Richard Wagner's music that inspired Dallapiccola to start composing in earnest, and Claude Debussy's that caused him to stop: hearing Der fliegende Holländer while exiled to Austria convinced the young man that composition was his calling, but after first hearing Debussy in 1921, at age 17, he stopped composing for three years in order to give this important influence time to sink in. The neoclassical works of Ferruccio Busoni would figure prominently in his later work, but his biggest influence would be the ideas of the Second Viennese School, which he encountered in the 1930s, particularly Alban Berg and Anton Webern. Dallapiccola's works of the 1920s (the period of his adherence to fascism) have been withdrawn, with the instruction that they never be performed, though they still exist under controlled access for study.

His works widely use the serialism developed and embraced by his idols; he was, in fact, the first Italian to write in the method, and the primary proponent of it in Italy, and he developed serialist techniques to allow for a more lyrical, tonal style. Throughout the 1930s his style developed from a  diatonic style with bursts of chromaticism to a consciously serialist outlook. He went from using twelve-tone rows for melodic material to structuring his works entirely serially. With the adoption of serialism he never lost the feel for melodic line that many of the detractors of the Second Viennese School claimed to be absent in modern  dodecaphonic music. His disillusionment with Mussolini's regime effected a change in his style: after the Abyssinian campaign, he claimed that his writing would no longer ever be light and carefree as it once was. While there are later exceptions, particularly the Piccolo concerto per Muriel Couvreux, this is largely the case.

Liriche Greche (1942–45), for solo voice with instruments, would be his first work composed entirely in this twelve-tone style, composed concurrently with his last original purely diatonic work, the ballet Marsia (1943). The following decade showed a refinement in his technique and the increasing influence of Webern's work. After this, from the 1950s on, the refined, contemplative style he developed would characterize his output, in contrast to the more raw and passionate works of his youth. Most of his works would be songs for solo voice and instrumental accompaniment. His touch with instrumentation is noted for its impressionistic sensuality and soft textures, heavy on sustained notes by woodwinds and strings (particularly middle-range instruments, such as the clarinet and viola).

The politically charged Canti di prigionia for chorus and ensemble was the beginning of a loose triptych on the highly personal themes of imprisonment and injustice; the one-act opera Il prigioniero and the cantata Canti di liberazione completed the trilogy.  Of these, Il prigioniero (1944–48) has become Dallapiccola's best-known work.  It tells the chilling story of a political prisoner whose jailor, in an apparent gesture of fraternity, allows him to escape from his cell.  At the moment of his freedom, however, he finds he has been the victim of a cruel practical joke as he runs straight into the arms of the Grand Inquisitor, who smilingly leads him off to the stake at which he is to be burned alive.  The opera's pessimistic outlook reflects Dallapiccola's complete disillusionment with fascism (which he had naïvely supported when Mussolini first came to power) and the music contained therein is both beautifully realized and supremely disquieting.

His final opera Ulisse, with his own libretto after The Odyssey, was the culmination of his life's work. It was composed over eight years, including and developing themes from his earlier works, and was his last large-scale composition.

List of  works
Partita (1930–32), orchestra
Estate (1932), male chorus
Divertimento in quattro esercizi (1934), soprano, flute, oboe, clarinet, viola, cello
Musica per tre pianoforti (Inni) (1935), three pianos
Sei cori di Michelangelo Buonarroti il Giovane (1932–36), 1st series: unaccompanied mixed voices; 2nd series: two sopranos and two altos and 17 instruments; 3rd series: mixed voices and orchestra
Tre laudi (1936–37), voice and 13 instruments
Volo di Notte (1938), one-act opera
Canti di prigionia (1938–41), for chorus, two pianos, 2 harps and percussion (a: Preghiera di Maria Stuarda; b: Invocazione di Boezio; c: Congedo di Girolamo Savonarola)
Piccolo concerto per Muriel Couvreux (1939–41), piano and chamber orchestra
Studio sul Capriccio n. 14 di Niccolò Paganini (1942), piano
Marsia (1942–43), ballet
Frammenti sinfonici dal balletto Marsia (1942–43), orchestra
Liriche greche (1942–45), a: Cinque frammenti di Saffo, for voice and chamber orchestra; b: Due liriche di Anacreonte, for singer, piccolo clarinet, A clarinet, viola, piano; c: Sex Carmina Alcaei, for canenda voice, nonnullis comitantibus musicis
Il prigioniero (1944–48), opera.
Ciaccona, Intermezzo e Adagio (1945), for solo cello
Sonatina canonica, in mi bemolle maggiore, su Capricci di Niccolò Paganini, per pianoforte (1946), for piano
Rencesvals (1946), baritone and piano
Due studi (1946–47), violin and piano
Due pezzi (1947), orchestra (version of Due studi)
Quattro liriche di Antonio Machado (1948), soprano and piano
Tre episodi dal balletto Marsia (1949), piano
Tre poemi (1949), voice and chamber orchestra
Job (1950), sacra rappresentazione (mystery play)
Tartiniana (1951), violin and orchestra
Quaderno musicale di Annalibera (1952), solo piano, featuring the BACH motif
Goethe-Lieder (1953), for mezzo-soprano, piccolo clarinet, clarinet, and bass clarinet
Variazioni (1954), orchestra (version of Quaderno musicale di Annalibera)
Piccola musica notturna (1954), orchestra
Canti di liberazione (1951–55), for mixed chorus and orchestra
An Mathilde (1955), cantata for soprano and orchestra
Tartiniana seconda (1955–56), violin and piano, or violin and chamber orchestra
Cinque canti  (1956), baritone and 8 instruments
Concerto per la notte di Natale dell'anno 1956 (1957), chamber orchestra and soprano
Requiescant (1957–58), chorus and orchestra
Dialoghi (1960), cello and orchestra
Piccola musica notturna (1960–61), chamber ensemble
Three Questions With Two Answers (1962), orchestra
Preghiere (1962), baritone and chamber orchestra
Parole di San Paolo (1964), voice and instruments
Quattro liriche di Antonio Machado (1964), version for soprano and chamber orchestra
Ulisse (1960–68), opera in a prologue and two acts
Sicut umbra... (1970), mezzo-soprano and 12 instruments
Tempus destruendi / Tempus aedificandi (1971), chorus
Ulisse. Suite dall'opera/A (1971), soprano, bass-baritone, orchestra
Ulisse. Suite dall'opera/B (1971), 3 sopranos, mezzo-soprano/alto, tenor, bass-baritone, chorus and orchestra
Commiato (1972), soprano and ensemble

Writings by Dallapiccola
 Appunti. Incontri. Meditazioni., Edizioni Suvini Zerboni, 1970
 Dallapiccola on Opera, Selected writings of Luigi Dallapiccola, Vol 1, Toccata Press (1987)

Writings in English on Dallapiccola
Raymond Fearn, The music of Luigi Dallapiccola. New York, Rochester, 2003
Edward Wilkinson, "An interpretation of serialism in the work of Luigi Dallapiccola". Phd diss., Royal Holloway, 1982
Ben Earle, "Musical modernism in fascist Italy: Dallapiccola in the thirties", Phd diss., Cambridge, 2001

References

Steven A. Kennedy, "On looking up by chance at the constellations: Luigi Dallapiccola's 'Sicut umbra'," MA thesis, UNC-Chapel Hill, 1990.
John C. G. Waterhouse, "Luigi Dallapiccola". Grove Music Online.
Anthony Sellors, "Luigi Dallapiccola", "Ulisse", "Il prigionero". Grove Music Online (OperaBase).

External links

Istria on the Internet: Prominent Istrians
CompositionToday: Luigi Dallapiccola Overview
 

1904 births
1975 deaths
People from Pazin
Istrian Italian people
Italian classical composers
Italian male classical composers
20th-century classical composers
Twelve-tone and serial composers
Italian opera composers
Male opera composers
Deaths from pulmonary edema
Modernist composers
Pupils of Vito Frazzi
20th-century Italian composers
20th-century Italian male musicians